Keşlik can refer to:

 Keşlik, Amasya
 Keşlik, Karacabey